= Lagos Life =

Browser-based life simulation game

Lagos Life is a browser-based life simulation game set in a virtual environment inspired by Lagos, Nigeria. Developed by Nigerian software developer Shalom Rayhamen, the game was released on 1 October 2026. Players create characters and take part in simulated activities such as employment, housing, social interaction and managing virtual currency.

== Gameplay ==
The game runs in a web browser and does not require a conventional download. Players control characters in a shared virtual setting and can undertake jobs, manage virtual money, pay rent and interact with other players. Its setting draws on aspects of everyday life and popular culture in Lagos.

== Development and release ==
Lagos Life was released on 1 October 2026, Nigeria's Independence Day. Rayhamen has said the game was influenced by the life simulation game The Sims 3 and by Lagos Run, a browser game centred on driving a danfo minibus through Lagos traffic.

== Reception and growth ==
The game received media attention in Nigeria shortly after its release. Techpoint Africa reported on 5 October that the game's dashboard showed more than 1.2 million players. The publication noted that the figures came from the game's own statistics and had not been independently verified.

On 9 October, TheCable reported that Vatar, the company behind the game, had announced a US$500,000 funding round at a reported valuation of US$10 million. The report attributed the player-growth claims to Rayhamen. Techpoint Africa separately reported on the company's funding and valuation.
